The Consensus 2000 College Basketball All-American team, as determined by aggregating the results of four major All-American teams.  To earn "consensus" status, a player must win honors from a majority of the following teams: the Associated Press, the USBWA, The Sporting News and the National Association of Basketball Coaches.

2000 Consensus All-America team

Individual All-America teams

AP Honorable Mention:

 Joe Adkins, Oklahoma State
 Gilbert Arenas, Arizona
 Erick Barkley, St. John's
 SirValiant Brown, George Washington
 Craig "Speedy" Claxton, Hofstra
 Eric Coley, Tulsa
 Mark Dickel, UNLV
 Juan Dixon, Maryland
 Khalid El-Amin, Connecticut
 Jason Gardner, Arizona
 Tony Harris, Tennessee
 Eddie House, Arizona State
 Casey Jacobsen, Stanford
 Dan Langhi, Vanderbilt
 Desmond Mason, Oklahoma State
 Pete Mickeal, Cincinnati
 Mike Miller, Florida
 Terence Morris, Maryland
 Chris Porter, Auburn
 Michael Redd, Ohio State
 Quentin Richardson, DePaul
 Doc Robinson, Auburn
 Etan Thomas, Syracuse
 Jason Williams, Duke
 Loren Woods, Arizona
 Michael Wright, Arizona
 Vincent Yarbrough, Tennessee

References

NCAA Men's Basketball All-Americans
All-Americans